Christmas with You may refer to:
 Christmas with You (Clint Black album)
 Christmas with You (Rick Springfield album)
 Christmas with You (film)